Jake Bird (December 14, 1901 – July 15, 1949) was an American serial killer who was tried and executed for the axe murders of Bertha Kludt and her daughter Beverly June Kludt in Tacoma, Washington in 1947, and has since been linked to 11 other homicides across several states. It is also suspected that Bird may have killed as many as 46 people.

In 1991, criminologist Eric W. Hickey, Ph.D., Director of Alliant International University's Center for Forensic Studies, wrote about how the Bird case challenges stereotypes of serial killers, who are mostly thought to be Caucasian males, whereas African-American killers typically are associated with urban violence. Hickey wrote, "Revelations that Jake Bird, a black man, had actually stalked and killed dozens of white women in the 1940s in dozens of states...continue[s] to challenge traditionally held profiles of serial killers."

Kludt murders 
On October 30, 1947, the home of Bertha Kludt and her daughter, Beverly June Kludt, was broken into by an intruder with an ax. When Bertha tried to pull out a weapon, the perpetrator hacked her to death with the ax. Her daughter Beverly soon came downstairs and confronted her mother's killer, and soon the killer hacked her to death as well.

Two police officers, sent to the Tacoma residence to investigate reports of screams from inside the residence, saw a man run out the back door and subsequently gave chase. The suspect was captured and taken to the Tacoma City Jail, where he confessed to the killings and identified himself as Jake Bird, claiming the murders were a result of a burglary gone bad.

The 45-year-old Bird had an extensive criminal record, including many counts of burglary and attempted murder, and had been incarcerated for a total of 31 years in Michigan, Iowa and Utah. Bird was a transient who had been born in Louisiana in a location he could not remember. He supported himself as a manual laborer and railroad gandy dancer, who laid and maintained tracks. The work on the railroad kept him moving from place to place.

The Bird hex
After his conviction was announced, Bird was allowed to make a final statement. He spoke for 20 minutes, noting that his request to represent himself had been denied and that his own lawyers were against him.

Bird then said, "I'm putting the Jake Bird hex on all of you who had anything to do with my being punished. Mark my words, you will die before I do." Allegedly, six people connected with the trial died: Judge Edward D. Hodge of a heart attack within a month of sentencing him to death, as did one of the officers who took his first confession. A police officer who took a second confession died, as did the court's chief clerk, and one of Bird's prison guards. J.W. Selden, one of Bird's lawyers, died on the first anniversary of his sentencing.

Reprieve, appeals and execution

The execution at the Washington State Penitentiary was scheduled for January 16, 1948, but Bird claimed he had committed 44 other murders which he was willing to help the police solve. Washington governor Monrad C. Wallgren granted him a 60-day reprieve. Police from other states interviewed Bird, and eleven murders were substantiated. He was knowledgeable enough about the 33 other murders to be considered a prime suspect.

The interviews with Bird enabled the police departments of many states to declare many unsolved murders as solved. In addition to his Washington state murders, the transient Bird apparently had killed people in Florida, Illinois, Iowa, Kansas, Kentucky, Michigan, Nebraska, Ohio, Oklahoma, South Dakota and Wisconsin. He mostly preyed on Caucasian women. Bird had dispatched his victims with an axe or hatchet.

During his reprieve, Bird lodged an appeal but a retrial was denied by the Washington State Supreme Court. His appeals to the federal courts, including three petitions to the United States Supreme Court, also were denied. He was hanged on the morning of July 15, 1949, at 12:20 a.m., before 125 witnesses. He was buried in an unmarked grave in the prison cemetery.

See also 
 List of serial killers in the United States
 List of serial killers by number of victims

References

External links
 History Link, Jake Bird is hanged for the murder of two Tacoma women on July 15, 1949

1901 births
1947 murders in the United States
1949 deaths
20th-century African-American people
20th-century executions by Washington (state)
20th-century executions of American people
American murderers of children
American people convicted of attempted murder
American people convicted of burglary
Axe murder
Executed African-American people
Executed American serial killers
Male serial killers
People executed by Washington (state) by hanging
Prisoners and detainees of Iowa
Prisoners and detainees of Michigan
Prisoners and detainees of Utah
Stabbing attacks in the United States
Violence against women in the United States